This article is for films both fictional and non-fictional which focus on anarchism, anarchist movements and/or anarchist characters as a theme.

Films with actors and fictional films

Documentaries

See also 
 List of films produced in the Spanish Revolution
 Filmography of environmentalism

References

External links 
"Anarchism and Film". A database created by Santiago Juan-Navarro and hosted by ChristieBooks
"A revolution in cinema?" by Duncan Campbell in The Guardian. An article dealing with anarchist films
"Anarchist films" by Anarcho. An article on the subject which includes the trailers of some important films
"Anarchist videos" by Anarchism.org

 
Anarchism
Anarchist culture
Anarchism lists
Anarchism